Annual Review of Political Science  is an annual peer-reviewed academic journal published by Annual Reviews, covering significant developments in the field of political science, including political theory and philosophy, international relations, political economy, political behavior, American and comparative politics, public administration and policy, and methodology. It was established in 1998 and its editors are Margaret Levi (Center for Advanced Study in the Behavioral Sciences, Stanford University) and Nancy Rosenblum (Harvard University).

As of 2022, Journal Citation Reports gives the journal a 2021 impact factor as 12.077, ranking it first of 187 journal titles in the category "Political Science".

History
The Annual Review of Political Science published its first volume in 1998; the first editor was Nelson W. Polsby. Upon Polsby's death in 2007, editorship passed to Margaret Levi. She was joined by Nancy L. Rosenblum, who is credited as co-editor for issues from 2015 onward. Until 2016, the journal was published both in print and online. Beginning in 2017, it is only published online. Under Annual Reviews's Subscribe to Open publishing model, the 2020 volume of the Annual Review of Political Science was published open access, a first for the journal.

The journal covers significant developments in political science, including political philosophy, international relations, political behavior, political economy, comparative politics, politics of the United States, and content relating to the policy and methodology of public administration. As of 2021, Journal Citation Reports gives the journal a 2020 impact factor as 8.091, ranking it first of 187 journal titles in the category "Political Science".

Editorial processes
The Annual Review of Political Science is helmed by the editor or co-editors. The editors are assisted by the editorial committee, which includes associate editors, regular members, and occasionally guest editors. Guest members participate at the invitation of the editors, and serve terms of one year. All other members of the editorial committee are appointed by the Annual Reviews board of directors and serve five-year terms. The editorial committee determines which topics should be included in each volume and solicits reviews from qualified authors. Unsolicited manuscripts are not accepted. Peer review of accepted manuscripts is undertaken by the editorial committee.

Current editorial committee
As of 2022, the editorial committee consists of the two co-editors and the following members:

 Vincent L. Hutchings
 Helen V. Milner
 Eric Schickler
 Dustin Tingley
 Cornelia Woll

See also
Annual Reviews:List of titles
List of political science journals

References

 

Political Science
Annual journals
Publications established in 1998
English-language journals
Political science journals